Cheppave Chirugali is a 2004 Indian Telugu-language drama film directed by Vikraman. The film stars Venu Thottempudi, Abhirami and Ashima Bhalla . It is the Telugu remake of his own 2002 Tamil film Unnai Ninaithu. It was produced by  Venkata Shyam Prasad under SP Entertainments.

Plot
Venu works as a receptionist in a lodge in Vishakapatnam. He, along with his friend Krishnamurthy, manages the entire lodge. The lodge is owned by Venu's father but has been leased due to financial troubles. Radha is the daughter of the new manager for the lodge who stays next to the lodge along with her mother and family. Radha gets attracted towards Venu upon seeing his good nature, but Venu tells his past love story to Radha.
A few years back, Nirmala lived in the same house where Radha lives now. Venu likes Nirmala and helps her family financially. Slowly, Venu and Nirmala fall in love, and Nirmala's parents decide to get them married. Ramji is Venu’s friend who stays with him during his initial days. Later, Ramji secures a good job and starts earning well. Ramji also gets attracted towards Nirmala and tries to impress her. Nirmala's parents consider Ramji to be a better match for Nirmala as he earns more than Venu. They convince Nirmala to marry Ramji.
Venu gets heartbroken knowing this, but one day, he finds Ramji in a shopping mall with another girl. Venu understands that Ramji has no intention of marrying Nirmala and is planning only for an illegitimate relationship with her. Venu informs this to Nirmala, who misunderstands that he is trying to break her relationship with Ramji by cooking up false stories. Nirmala, along with her family, moves to a big house given by Ramji.
The story comes to the present, and Radha is even more impressed upon listening to Venu's past love story. One day, Venu finds Nirmala and gets to know that Ramji had broken the promise to marry her and humiliated her and her family and they had to leave everything and return to poverty. Venu is worried seeing Nirmala and her family's poor state and again offers help. Nirmala had plans of pursuing MBBS before. Venu helps her for writing the entrance examination. She gets admission only in a private medical college where the fee is high. Venu sells his lodge to the lessee and gives the money to Nirmala to use it as the education fee.
Five years pass by, and Nirmala completes her medical degree and gets a job posting, as well. All these years, Venu gave her financial and moral support in pursuing her education. Meanwhile, Radha also remains unmarried as she loves Venu, but she never expressed it to him. Nirmala is about to leave to Hyderabad for a job along with her family. At the railway station, she conveys her interest in marrying Venu, who refuses her proposal by saying that he helped her only because he once loved her and didn't wish to see her in poverty, but did not harbour any feelings for her. He says that he knows that Radha is in love with him and that she has been declining all marriage alliances coming her way for the last five years waiting for Venu. Venu also says that Radha's love is more genuine than Nirmala's because Nirmala ditched him when she found a better guy than Venu, while Radha was rejecting all other proposals for him. Radha overhears the conversation and feels happy. The movie ends with both Venu and Radha getting united.

Cast

Venu Thottempudi as Venu
Abhirami as Radha
Ashima Bhalla as Nirmala
Kaikala Satyanarayana as Hotel manager
Ramji as Ramji
Giri Babu
Sunil as Krishnamurthy
Sudhakar
L.B. Sriram 
Krishna Bhagavaan
Mouli as Nirmala's father
Ramesh Khanna as Venu's friend
Visweswara Rao
Master Deepak
Trinadh
Sangeeta
Subhashini 
Radhika
Jabardasth Apparao
Pandu
Kiran Rathod as an item number "Paapa Poothota"

Music

The music of Cheppave Chirugali was composed by S. A. Rajkumar. All the songs from the original Tamil version Unnai Ninaithu composed by Sirpy were retained in this version.

References

Telugu remakes of Tamil films
2000s Telugu-language films